Pingasa crenaria is a moth of the family Geometridae first described by Achille Guenée in 1858. It is found in India and Taiwan.

References

Pseudoterpnini
Moths described in 1858
Taxa named by Achille Guenée